The Bendinat London Seniors Masters was a men's professional golf tournament for players aged 50 and above as part of the European Seniors Tour. It was played in 1995 and then from 2005 to 2007. The event was played at the London Golf Club, Ash, Sevenoaks, Kent. It was played over the Heritage Course, which was designed by Jack Nicklaus. Sam Torrance of Scotland won the 2005 event on his way to topping the European Seniors Tour Order of Merit. In 2007 the prize fund was £150,000.

Winners

External links
Coverage on the European Senior Tour's official site
Coverage of the 1995 event on the European Senior Tour's official site
The London Golf Club

Former European Senior Tour events
Golf tournaments in England
Sport in Kent
Recurring sporting events established in 1995
Recurring sporting events disestablished in 2007
Defunct sports competitions in England
1995 establishments in England
2007 disestablishments in England